Telechips(텔레칩스) is a fabless company headquartered in Seoul, founded in 1999 with regional offices in Japan (Tokyo), China (Shenzhen, Shanghai, Dalian), USA (Irvine, Detroit), Germany (Munich) and Singapore that designs integrated circuits.

Products 
The company sells system on a chip products used in intelligent automotive cockpit systems  and Smart STB/OTT. 
These are based on the ARM architecture and support Android, Windows Embedded Compact, Nucleus RTOS, AUTOSAR, freeRTOS, QNX, Green Hills, Free OSEK, and Linux.

Application processors 
TCC803x (Dolphin+) (ARM Cortex-A53 Quad, Cortex-A7 Quad, Cortex-R5)
TCC899x (Lion) (ARM Cortex-A53 Quad)
TCC802x (Dolphin) (ARM Cortex-A7 Quad, Cortex-A7 Single, Cortex-M4)
TCC898x (Alligator) (ARM Cortex-A53 Quad)
TCC897x (ARM Cortex-A7 Quad)
TCC893x (ARM Cortex-A9 Dual Core)
TCC892x (ARM Cortex-A5)
TCC880x (ARM Cortex-A8)
TCC890x (ARM 11)
TCC8010 (ARM9)
TCC8005S (ARM9)

Companion & Communication ICs 
TCC3171 / TCC3170 (T-DMB/DAB).
TCC3510 / TCC3520 (T-DMB/DVB-T/One-Seg/CMMB).
TCC3530 / TCC3531 / TCC3532 (ISDB-T).
TCM3840 (Bluetooth, 802.11ac WiFi Module).
TCM3910 (Bluetooth Module).
TCM3902 (Bluetooth Module).
TCC7604 (Audio DSP).
TCC5027 (PMIC).
TCC5028 (PMIC).
AD55 (Video Decoder)

See also 
Encipher Inye

References

External links 
Telechips.com
Telechips devices on ARMdevices.net

ARM architecture
Embedded microprocessors
Fabless semiconductor companies
Semiconductor companies of South Korea